The Cupa Ligii Final was the final match of the 2014–15 Cupa Ligii, played between Steaua București and Pandurii Târgu Jiu. Steaua București won the match with 3–0.

Match

References

External links
 Official site 

2015
2014–15 in Romanian football
2015